Larry Brahm (August 12, 1916 – June 16, 1959) was an American football guard. He played for the Cleveland Rams in 1942.

References

1916 births
1959 deaths
American football guards
Cleveland Rams players
Temple Owls football players
Sportspeople from Bayonne, New Jersey
Players of American football from New Jersey